Il coraggio is a 1955 Italian comedy film directed by Domenico Paolella.

Plot 
Commendatore Aristide Paoloni is a man all of a piece, strong and brave, who prides himself on saving lives. His specialty is to avoid drowning suicides that are thrown into the Tiber from the Milvian Bridge in Rome, and so one day Aristide saves the poor Gennaro. Gennaro, realizing the situation, pretends to Aristide Paoloni a job, but the man ignores him. So, Gennaro begins to disturb the quiet family life of the Commendatore, who soon begins to look for a way to kill the poor Gennaro.

Cast 
Totò: Gennaro Vaccariello/Janeiro Vaccarillos
Gino Cervi: Comm. Aristide Paoloni
Gianna Maria Canale: Susy Esposito 
Irène Galter: Irene
Gabriele Tinti: Raffaele
Paola Barbara: Anna
Leopoldo Trieste: amministratore Rialti
Ernesto Almirante: Salvatore 
Anna Campori: Ginevra

References

External links

1955 films
Films directed by Domenico Paolella
Italian comedy films
Films set in Rome
1955 comedy films
Italian black-and-white films
1950s Italian films
1950s Italian-language films